According to Church of Scientology doctrine, Helatrobus was an "interplanetary nation", now extinct, which existed trillions of years ago.

Government
In his State of OT lecture, Scientology founder L. Ron Hubbard described them as:
"a little pipsqueak government, didn't amount to very much."  
This same description also appears in the Dianetics and Scientology Technical Dictionary (first edition, pg. 196). The official insignia of Helatrobus was a gold cross, "like the American Red Cross or something of the sort."

In the HCO Bulletin of April 17, AD13 ("Aircraft Door Goals"), Hubbard states that the total life span of the Helatrobus government was between 52 trillion and 38 trillion years
ago.

Implants
Despite Hubbard's description of them as small and insignificant, he attributed to the Helatrobans a set of "implants", including the Heaven Implants, given 43 trillion years before the present, (SHSBC tapes 294, 295 and 300 - #s 6305C21, 6305C23
and 6306C11) and the Gorilla Goals, created "between about 319 trillion years ago to about 256 trillion trillion years ago" (or 89 trillion trillion years ago, according to a different lecture). ("Routine 3N: Line Plots", HCOB 14 July 1963).

Hubbard also discoursed on another set of "Helatrobus Implants", located "382 trillion years ago to 52 trillion years ago". In a series of lectures, Hubbard gives further detail:

Planets were surrounded suddenly by radioactive cloud masses. And very often a long time before the planet came under attack from these implant people, waves of radioactive clouds, Magellanic clouds, black and gray, would sweep over and engulf the planet, and it would be living in an atmosphere of radioactivity, which was highly antipathetic to the living beings, bodies, plants, anything else that was on this planet.
And so planetary systems would become engulfed in radioactive masses, gray and black. And the earmarks of such a planetary action was gray and black – gray towering masses of clouds. These Magellanic clouds would not otherwise have come anywhere near a planetary system.("State of OT")

When a planet was engulfed, the Helatrobans attacked it with "little orange-colored bombs that would talk", and the clouds themselves would speak: "And here you'd have a gray cloud going by and it'd be saying, 'Hark! Hark! Hark!' you see? 'Watch out! Look out! Who's there? Who's that?'".

People on the planet's surface would be kidnapped using a small capsule "placed at will in space. It shot out a large bubble, the being would grab at the bubble or strike at it and be sucked at once into the capsule. Then the capsule would be retracted into an aircraft." A victim was implanted for up to six months and the Helatrobans would "fix him on a post in a big bunch of stuff ... put him on a post and wobbled him around and ran him through this implant of goals on a little monowheel [sic]. Little monowheel pole trap. And it had the effigy of a body on it." ("State of OT").

Free Zone
Ralph Hilton, a Free Zone Scientologist, has been researching Hubbard's teachings about the Helatrobus implants and publishes information about them. The Free Zone Scientologists seek to make Scientology's inner teachings public, and to bypass control of this information by the Church as run today by David Miscavige. Hilton lists the Helatrobus Implant goals on his website and they include such fundamental things as "To forget", "To remember", and "To Know", but also such specific things as "To be dead", "To be God", "To have entities", and "To be a vampire".

Scientific critiques
Critics have noted many scientific implausibilities connected with the story of Helatrobus. Peter Forde's paper "A Scientific Scrutiny of OT III" (which also covers Scientologists' belief in the ancient galactic ruler Xenu) analyzes the matter in detail.

Contrary to Hubbard's statements, the Magellanic Clouds are dwarf galaxies seemingly orbiting our own Milky Way, and are not clouds at all in any atmospheric sense.  In many of Hubbard's lectures, the term 'Magellanic Clouds' is often a colloquialism for 'interstellar nebula'
Additionally, Scientology's placing of these events trillions of years ago contradicts the currently accepted age of the Universe as 13.8 billion years.

Litigation
The removed "Helatrobus" search result was a page from Operation Clambake which included audio and transcripts from Hubbard's lectures on this and other ancient alien civilizations.

Operation Clambake subsequently self-censored the page and Google resumed including the censored link without the warning at the bottom of the page.

See also

 Space opera in Scientology scripture
 Galactic Confederacy
 Marcab Confederacy
 Xenu
 Implant (Scientology)
 Incident (Scientology)

References

Lectures by Hubbard
SHSBC-294, "The Helatrobus Implants", 21 May 1963
SHSBC-295, "Engram Running -- Helatrobus Implant Goal", 22 May 1963
SHSBC-296, "State of OT", 23 May 1963
SHSBC-300, "Engram Chain Running".  11 June 1963
"Assists" lecture. 3 October 1968, #10 in the Class VIII series. (Audio extracts -)

HCO Bulletins
 Aircraft Door Goals", HCOB April 17, 1963
"Heaven", HCOB May 11, 1963 (no longer published by the Church of Scientology)
"Routine 3N: Line Plots", HCOB 14 July 1963
"Routine 3N - The Train GPMs - The Marcab Between Lives Implants", HCOB 24 August 1963

Books
 Jon Atack, A Piece Of Blue Sky (Kensington Publishing Corporation, New York, 1990)
 Bent Corydon and L. Ron Hubbard Jr., L. Ron Hubbard: Messiah Or Madman? (Lyle Stuart, New Jersey, 1987)
 L. Ron Hubbard, Scientology: A History of Man, 1954
 L. Ron Hubbard, Dianetics and Scientology Technical Dictionary (current edition, Bridge Publications, 1995)
 L. Ron Hubbard, Scientology 8-8008 (current edition, Bridge Publications, 1989)
 Russell Miller, Bare-Faced Messiah: The True Story Of L. Ron Hubbard (Henry Holt, New York, 1988)
 Christopher Partridge, UFO Religions (Routledge, 2003)

Footnotes

External links
 chillingeffects.org on Google lawsuit
 Operation Clambake's 'censored' page
 Ralph Hilton's website
 Italian mirror of Operation Clambake's Marcab-Helatrobus info

Non-scientific hypothetical planets
Scientology beliefs and practices
Mythological peoples